Alon Buzorgi (born 29 March 1990) is an Israeli footballer currently playing for Hapoel Kfar Saba.

Career

Club 
Buzorgi started his professional career with boyhood club, Ironi Kiryat Shmona.

On September 21, 2010 Buzorgi signed a 3-year contract with Hapoel Haifa.

References

External links
 

Living people
1990 births
Israeli Jews
Israeli footballers
Hapoel Ironi Kiryat Shmona F.C. players
Hapoel Haifa F.C. players
Beitar Tel Aviv Bat Yam F.C. players
Hapoel Asi Gilboa F.C. players
Hapoel Jerusalem F.C. players
Ironi Tiberias F.C. players
Hapoel Herzliya F.C. players
Hapoel F.C. Karmiel Safed players
Maccabi Tzur Shalom F.C. players
F.C. Haifa Robi Shapira players
Maccabi Ahi Nazareth F.C. players
Hapoel Afula F.C. players
Hapoel Nof HaGalil F.C. players
Israeli Premier League players
Liga Leumit players
Footballers from Kiryat Shmona
Association football forwards